On 6 August 2022, a bus crash in Croatia killed 12 people. It was the deadliest road incident in the country since 2008.

Events 
The bus left Częstochowa on 5 August, and was carrying Polish pilgrims of the Brotherhood of St Joseph Catholic group to a shrine in Medjugorje, Bosnia and Herzegovina. The bus veered off the road and crashed into a ditch. The crash occurred on the A4 highway near Breznički Hum. 12 people were killed and 32 were injured. The official cause of the accident has yet to be determined. According to Croatian media, the driver fell asleep or fainted.

Response 
Polish Prime Minister Mateusz Morawiecki confirmed the tragedy. Prime Minister of Croatia Andrej Plenković tweeted his condolences to the victims.

References

See also 

 2022 in Croatia

Road incidents in Croatia
2022 road incidents in Europe
August 2022 events in Croatia
2022 road incidents
2022 in Croatia
2022 disasters in Croatia